Boris Verho is a Finnish poet. He won the Helsingin Sanomat Literature Prize in 1985 for his collection of poems Varastossa aina palaa valo (There is always a light in the Warehouse, Arvi Karisto).

References

20th-century Finnish poets
Year of birth missing (living people)
Living people
Place of birth missing (living people)
Finnish male poets
20th-century Finnish male writers